The Ministry of Economy and Finance is a cabinet ministry of the government of Ecuador responsible for overseeing the nation's public finances.

Ministers of Finance 
Antonio Fernández Salvador, 1830-1831
José Félix Valdivieso, 1831
Juan García del Río, 1832-1834
Francisco Eugenio Tamariz, 1835-1836
Manuel López Escobar, 1836-1837
Antonio Fernández Salvador, 1838
Manuel López Escobar, 1839
Luis de Saa, 1839-1842
Juan Hipólito Soulin, 1842
Francisco de Aguirre, 1843-1845
Roberto Ascázubi, 1846
Manuel Bustamante, 1846-1847
José Javier Valdivieso, 1848-1849
Manuel Bustamante, 1849
Luis de Saa, 1849
Manuel López Escobar, 1849
Carlos Chiriboga, 1850-1851
José María Caamaño, 1852
Francisco Marcos, 1852
Marcos Espinel, 1853-1854
Teodoro Gómez de la Torre, 1855
Francisco Pablo Icaza, 1855-1857
Antonio Yerovi, 1858-1859
José Sánchez Brun, 1860
Carlos Aguirre, 1861
Rafael Carvajal, 1862
Camilo Ponce Ortiz, 1863
Víctor Laso, 1863
Pablo Bustamante Iturralde, 1864-1865
Francisco E. Tamariz, 1865
Antonio Flores Jijón, 1865
Manuel Bustamante, 1866
Bernardo Dávalos, 1867
Manuel Bustamante, 1867
Camilo Ponce Ortiz, 1867
Manuel de Ascásubi, 1868
Julio Castro Bastus, 1868
Manuel de Ascásubi, 1868
Gabriel García Moreno, 1868
Rafael Carvajal, 1869
José María Baquerizo, 1869-1870
Roberto de Ascázubi, 1870
José Javier Eguiguren, 1870-1871
Vicente Lucio Salazar, 1873
José Javier Eguiguren, 1874-1875
Rafael Pólit, 1875
Manuel Gómez de la Torre, 1876
José Rafael Arízaga, 1876
José Vélez, 1876-1878
Julio Castro Bastus, 1878
Martín Icaza, 1878-1880
José Vélez, 1880
Martín Icaza, 1881-1882
José Álvarez, 1883
Manuel Noboa, 1883
Vicente Lucio Salazar, 1883
Camilo Andrade, 1883
Federico Galdos, 1883
Vicente Lucio Salazar, 1884-1887
Gabriel Jesús Núñez, 1888
Vicente Lucio Salazar, 1888
José Toribio Noboa, 1888-1889
Francisco Campos, 1889-1890
Gabriel Jesús Núñez, 1890-1893
Vicente Lucio Salazar, 1893
Francisco Andrade Marín, 1894
Alejandro Cárdenas, 1894-1895
Lizardo García, 1895
Gabriel Jesús Núñez, 1895
Francisco de Roca, 1895
Pedro Lizarzaburu, 1895
Carlos Pérez Quiñónez, 1895
Gabriel de Jesús Núñez Terán, 1895
F. P. Roca, 1895-1896
Serafín S. Wíther Navarro, 1896-1897
Ricardo Valdivieso Palacio, 1897-1900
Tomás Gagliardo Aubert, 1900-1901
Vidal Enríquez Ante, 1901
Juan F. Game Balarezo, 1901-1905
Camilo Echanique de la Serna, 1906
Amalio Puga Salazar, 1906-1907
Alejandro Reyes V., 1907
Jorge Marcos Aguirre, 1907-1908
Belisario Torres Otoya, 1908
Tomás Gagliardo Aubert, 1908-1909
César Borja Lavayen, 1909-1910
Luis Adriano Dillon Reina, 1910-1911
Manuel E. Escudero, 1911
Leónidas Plaza Gutiérrez, 1911
J. Federico Intriago Navas, 1911-1912
Juan F. Game Balarezo, 1912-1914
Agustín Cabezas G., 1914-1916
Carlos A. Borja Lavayen, 1916-1917
Miguel G. Hurtado, 1917-1920
Gustavo Aguirre O., 1920-1921
Emilio Cucalón Pareja, 1921-1922
Alfonso B. Larrea A., 1922-1924
Alberto Gómez Jaramillo, 1924
Miguel Ángel Albornoz Tabares, 1924-1925
Luis Napoleón Dillon Cabezas, 1925-1926
Humberto Albornoz, 1926
Pedro Leopoldo Núñez Terán, 1926-1927
Alberto Gómez Jaramillo, 1927-1928
Luis A. Carbo Noboa, 1928
Secundino Sáenz de Tejada, 1928-1929
Juan de Dios Martínez Mera, 1929-1930
Sixto Durán-Ballén Romero, 1930-1931
Pedro Leopoldo Nuñez Terán, 1931
Juan de Dios Martínez Mera, 1931-1932
Federico Cornejo Campuzano, 1932-1933
Augusto Alvarado Olea, 1933
Jaime Puig Arosemena, 1933
Manuel Stacey Cabeza de Vaca, 1933
Alfredo Espinosa Palacios, 1933
Cayetano Uribe Quiñonez, 1933-1934
Victor Emilio Estrada Sciacaluga, 1934
Carlos Arízaga Toral, 1934-1935
Luis A. Carbo Noboa, 1935
Enrique Arrate Crosby, 1935
Gerónimo Avilés Aguirre, 1935-1936
Alberto Wither Navarro, 1936-1937
Heleodoro Sáenz R., 1937-1938
Gabriel Martínez Intriago, 1938
José Carbo Puig, 1938
Carlos de Icaza Sániter, 1938
César A. Durango Montenegro, 1938-1939
César D. Andrade López, 1939
Carlos Freile Larrea, 1939-1940
Luis Cordovés Borja, 1940-1941
Vicente Illingworth Icaza, 1941-1944
Alberto Wright Vallarino, 1944
Luis Eduardo Lasso González, 1944
Mariano Suárez Veintimilla, 1944-1945
Enrique Arízaga Toral, 1945-1947
Jerónimo Avilés Alfaro, 1947
Luis Fernando Ruiz Lecaros, 1947
Ruperto Alarcón Falconí, 1947
Raúl Clemente Huerta Rendón, 1947-1948
Carlos Martínez Quirola, 1948-1950
José Araujo Luna, 1950-1951
Alfredo Peña Herrera, 1951-1952
José Araujo Luna, 1952
Nicolás Augusto Maldonado, 1952-1953
Wilson Vera Herbas, 1953-1954
Jaime Acosta Velasco, 1954-1955
José Gabriel Terán Varea, 1955-1956
Fausto Cordovez Chiriboga, 1956-1958
Isidro de Icaza Plaza, 1958
Luis Gómez Izquierdo, 1958-1959
José A. Ballén de la Calle, 1959-1960
José Garcés Alzamora, 1960-1961
Bolívar Lasso Carrión, 1961
Jorge Acosta Velasco, 1961
Manuel Naranjo Toro, 1961-1962
Juan Sevilla Delgado, 1962-1963
Jack Bermeo Cevallos, 1963-1964
Alberto Quevedo Toro, 1964-1965
Jaime Salvador Campuzano, 1965-1966
Guillermo Borja Enríquez, 1966
Renato Ruiz Drouet, 1966
Federico Intriago Arrata, 1966-1967
Manuel Correa Arroyo, 1967-1968
Luis Guzmán Vanegas, 1968-1969
Leonidas Avilés Robinson, 1969
Benito Ottati Moreira, 1969
Luis Gómez Izquierdo, 1969-1970
Jaime Aspiazu Seminario, 1970
Alonso Salgado Gueva, 1970-1971
Nestor Vega Moreno, 1972-1973
Enrique Salas Castillo, 1973-1974
Jaime Moncayo García, 1974-1975
Jaime Morillo Battle, 1975-1976
César Robalino Gonzaga, 1976
Santiago Sevilla Larrea, 1976-1978
Juan Reyna Santacruz, 1978-1979
Fernando Aspiazu Seminario, 1979-1980
Rodrigo Paz, 1980-1981
César Robalino Gonzaga, 1981-1982
Jaime Morillo Battle, 1982
Pedro Pinto Rubianes, 1982-1984
Francisco Swett Morales, 1984-1986
Alberto Dahik, 1986-1987
Rodrigo Espinosa Bermeo, 1987-1988
Eduardo Cabezas Molina, 1988
Jorge Gallardo Zavala, 1988-1991
Pablo Better Grunbaum, 1991-1992
Mario Ribadeneira Traversari, 1992-1993
César Robalino Gonzaga, 1993-1994
Modesto Correa San Andrés, 1994-1995
Mauricio Pinto Mancheno, 1995
Iván Andrade Apunte, 1995-1996
Pablo Concha Ledergerber, 1996-1997
Carlos Dávalos Rodas, 1997
Marco Flores Troncoso, 1997-1998
Fidel Jaramillo Buendía, 1998-1999
Ana Lucía Armijos, 1999
Guillermo Lasso, 1999 
Alfredo Arizaga González, 1999-2000
Jorge Guzmán Ortega, 2000
Luis Yturralde Mancero, 2000
Jorge Gallardo Zavala, 2001
Carlos Julio Emanuel, 2001-2002
Francisco Arosemena Robles, 2002-2003
Mauricio Pozo Crespo, 2003-2004
Mauricio Yépez, 2004-2005
Rafael Correa, 2005
Magdalena Barreiro, 2005
Diego Borja Cornejo, 2005-2006
Armando Rodas Espinel, 2006
José Jouvín Vernaza, 2006
Ricardo Patiño, 2007
Fausto Ortiz de la Cadena, 2007-2008
Wilma Salgado, 2008
María Elsa Viteri, 2008-2010
Patricio Rivera Yánez, 2010-2013
Fausto Herrera Nicolaide, 2013-2016
Patricio Rivera Yánez, 2016-2017
Carlos de la Torre Muñoz, 2017-2018
María Elsa Viteri, 2018
Richard Martínez Alvarado, 2018-2020
Mauricio Pozo Crespo, 2020-2021
Simón Cueva, 2021-2022
Pablo Arosemena Marriott, 2022-

See also 
 Central Bank of Ecuador
 Finance ministry
 Economy of Ecuador
 Government of Ecuador

References

External links 
 Ministry of Economy and Finance

Government of Ecuador
Ecuador
1830 establishments in Ecuador